Confidence is an unincorporated community on State Route 108 in Tuolumne County, California, United States, with a population of 50 people. The ZIP Code of the area is 95383. The community is inside area code 209.

References

Unincorporated communities in Tuolumne County, California
Unincorporated communities in California